Sir Robert Quarles (died 1639) was an English politician who sat in the House of Commons in 1625.

Quarles was the son of James Quarles of Stewards, Romford, Essex. He was admitted at Emmanuel College, Cambridge on 15 November 1599 and was admitted  at Lincoln's Inn on 25 October 1600.  He was knighted at Newmarket on 5  March 1608. In 1625, he was elected Member of Parliament for Colchester.  

Quarles died in 1639 and was buried at Romford on 2 February 1639.

Quarles married three times.

References

16th-century births
1639 deaths
English MPs 1625
Alumni of Emmanuel College, Cambridge
Members of Lincoln's Inn